Enzo Daniel Ruiz Eizaga (born 31 August 1988) is an Uruguayan footballer who currently plays for Chilean side Deportes Iquique as a defender.

Club career
Ruiz started his career playing with the Uruguayan giant C.A. Peñarol. He made his first team debut in the hands of Gregorio Pérez.

He was signed by the Swiss giant club Grasshopper in February 2009.

In July 2011, he signed a three-year contract with the Swiss Challenge League side AC Bellinzona.

In June 2012, it was announced that he was sent off on loan for one season to Swiss Super League side FC Luzern.

In August 2013, he returned to his country to play for Racing Club de Montevideo.

On 2021 season, he joined the club recently promoted to Primera B, Lautaro de Buin.

International career
Ruiz played for Uruguay U20 at 2007 FIFA U-20 World Cup in Canada.

References

External links

Profile at Swiss Super League 

1988 births
Living people
People from Mercedes, Uruguay
People from Soriano Department
Uruguayan footballers
Uruguay youth international footballers
Uruguay under-20 international footballers
Association football defenders
Uruguayan expatriate footballers
Peñarol players
Grasshopper Club Zürich players
AC Bellinzona players
FC Luzern players
Racing Club de Montevideo players
Deportes Concepción (Chile) footballers
Villa Española players
San Marcos de Arica footballers
Deportes La Serena footballers
Rangers de Talca footballers
Lautaro de Buin footballers
Deportes Iquique footballers
Uruguayan Primera División players
Swiss Super League players
Swiss Challenge League players
Primera B de Chile players
Chilean Primera División players
Uruguayan expatriate sportspeople in Chile
Expatriate footballers in Chile
Uruguayan expatriate sportspeople in Switzerland
Expatriate footballers in Switzerland